Robert Colin Green (born 10 February 1942) is a Welsh former footballer born in Brymbo, near Wrexham, who made 201 appearances in the Football League playing as a full back for Everton, Birmingham City and Wrexham. He played most of his professional club football for Birmingham City and was part of the team which won the League Cup in 1963. At international level he won 15 caps for Wales.

Honours 
Birmingham City
Football League Cup winners: 1963

References

External links
 

1942 births
Living people
Footballers from Wrexham
Welsh footballers
Wales international footballers
Wales under-23 international footballers
Association football fullbacks
Everton F.C. players
Birmingham City F.C. players
Wrexham A.F.C. players
Tamworth F.C. players